Henri Constant Gabriel Pierné (16 August 1863 – 17 July 1937) was a French composer, conductor, pianist and organist.

Biography
Gabriel Pierné was born in Metz. His family moved to Paris, after Metz and part of Lorraine were annexed to Germany in 1871 following the Franco-Prussian War. He studied at the Paris Conservatoire, gaining first prizes for solfège, piano, organ, counterpoint and fugue. He won the French Prix de Rome in 1882, with his cantata Edith. His teachers included Antoine François Marmontel, Albert Lavignac, Émile Durand, César Franck (for the organ) and Jules Massenet (for composition).

He succeeded César Franck as organist at Sainte-Clotilde Basilica in Paris from 1890 to 1898. He himself was succeeded by another distinguished Franck pupil, Charles Tournemire. Associated for many years with Édouard Colonne's concert series, the Concerts Colonne, from 1903, Pierné became chief conductor of this series in 1910.

His most notable early performance was the world premiere of Igor Stravinsky's ballet The Firebird, at the Ballets Russes, Paris, on 25 June 1910. He remained in the post until 1933 (when Paul Paray took over his duties).

He made a few electrical recordings for Odeon Records, from 1928 to 1934, conducting the L'Orchestre Colonne, including a 1929 performance of his Ramuntcho and a 1931 performance of excerpts from his ballet Cydalise et le Chevre-pied.

He died in Ploujean, Finistère.

Music

Pierné wrote several operas, choral and symphonic pieces as well as a good deal of chamber music. His most famous composition is probably the oratorio La Croisade des enfants based on the book by Marcel Schwob. Also notable are such shorter works as his March of the Little Lead Soldiers, which once enjoyed substantial popularity (not only in France) as an encore; the comparably popular Marche des petits faunes is from his ballet Cydalise et le Chèvre-pied. His chamber work Introduction et variations sur une ronde populaire for saxophone quartet is a standard in the saxophone quartet repertoire.

His discovery and promotion of the work of Ernest Fanelli in 1912 led to a controversy over the origins of impressionist music.

Honours
Pierné became a member of the Academie des Beaux Arts in 1925. He was made a Commandeur de la Légion d'Honneur in 1935. His tomb at Père Lachaise Cemetery has a headstone designed by sculptor Henri Bouchard.

Square Gabriel Pierné in Paris is named after him.

Selected compositions

Orchestral works
 Serenade for Strings
 Trois pièces formant suite de concert, 1883
 Suite No. 1, 1883
 Envois de Rome (Suite – Ouverture – Les Elfes), c. 1885
 Fantaisie-ballet, for piano and orchestra, 1885
 Piano concerto, Op. 12, 1886
 Scherzo-caprice, for piano and orchestra, 1890
 Ballet de cour, 1901
 Concertstück, for harp and orchestra, 1903
 Poème symphonique, for piano and orchestra, 1903
 Two suites from the incidental music for Ramuntcho, 1910
 Paysages franciscains, Op. 43, 1920
 Fantaisie basque, for violin and orchestra, 1927
 Divertissement sur un thème pastoral, Op. 49, 1932
 Gulliver au pays de Lilliput, 1935
 Viennoise, suite, Op. 49bis, 1935

Works for band
 Marche des petits soldats de plomb (March of the Little Lead Soldiers), 1887
 Marche solennelle, 1899 (dedicated to Gustave Wettge)
 Petit Gavotte et Farandole
 Ramuntcho (also arranged for orchestra), (published 1908)

Operas
 La Coupe enchantée, 1895
  Vendée (Drame lyrique), 1897
La Fille de Tabarin (opéra comique), 1901
 On ne badine pas avec l'amour (opéra comique), 1910
 Sophie Arnould (opéra comique), 1927
 Fragonard, 1934

Ballets
 Le Collier de Saphir, 1891
 Les Joyeuses commères de Paris, 1892
 Izéÿl, 1894
 Bouton-d'or, 1895
 Salome, 1895 (premiere starring Loie Fuller at the Comedie-Parisienne, Paris) March 4, 1895 closed 27 April.
 Cydalise et le Chèvre-pied, 1923
 Impressions de music-hall, 1927
 Giration, 1934
 Images, 1935

Music for theatre
 Yanthis, 1894
 La Princesse Lointaine, 1895
 La Samaritaine, 1897
 Francesca da Rimini, 1902
 Ramuntcho, 1908
 Les Cathédrales, 1915

Chamber works
 Sonata in D minor, Op. 36 (violin or flute and piano), 1900.
 Piano Quintet, Op. 41 (2 violins, viola, cello and piano), 1917
 Trio in C minor, Op. 45 (violin, cello and piano), 1920–21
 Sonata in F sharp minor, Op 46 (Sonate en une partie) (cello and piano), 1922
 Sonata da camera, Op.48 (flute, cello and piano), 1926

Piano works
 Étude de concert in C minor, Op. 13, 1887
 Album pour mes petits amis, Op. 14, (published 1887)

Solo works
 Serenade, Op. 7 (violin and piano), 1881
 Impromptu-Caprice, Op. 9 (harp), (published circa 1901)
 Piece in G minor (oboe), 1883
 Solo de concert (bassoon and piano), 1898
 Canzonetta, Op. 19 (clarinet and piano), 1888
 Trois pièces Op. 29 (organ), (published circa 1892)

Choral works
 L'An Mil, (published 1898)
 no. 1. Miserere Mei
 no. 2. Fete Des Fous Et de L'ane
 no. 3. Te Deum
 Les Cathédrales, 1915
 no. 1. Prélude des cathédrales 
 no. 3. Chanson Picarde
 no. 7. Épisode des églises 
 no. 8. Épisode des Flandres

Songs
 6 Ballades françaises de Paul Fort, (circa 1920) 
 No. 1, La Vie
 No. 2, La Baleines
 No. 3, Complainte des Arches de Noé
 No. 4, Le petit rentier
 No. 5, Les dernières pensées
 No. 6, La Ronde autour du monde
 Deux mélodies
 Découragement
 À Saint Blaise
 Poèmes de Jean Lorrain
 no. 1. Le Beau Pirate 
 no. 2. Les Petites Ophélies 
 no. 3. Les Petits Elfes 
 no. 4. Une belle est dans la forêt 
 no. 5. Ils étaient trois petits chats blancs
 Soirs de Jadis
 no. 1. La princesse au bord du ruisseau 
 no. 2. Ils s'aimaient
 no. 3. Ce qui frappa ses yeux d'abord
 no. 4. Le soir tombe sur la rivière
 Trois adaptations musicales sur des vers
 no. 1. La marjolaine
 no. 2. Nuit divine
 no. 3. Noël

Bibliography
 Henri Busser: Notice sur la vie et des oeuvres de M. Gabriel Pierné (Paris: Académie des Beaux Arts, 1938).
 Georges Masson: Gabriel Pierné, musicien lorrain (Nancy: Presses Universitaires de Nancy, 1987).

References

External links
 Naxos.com: Gabriel Pierné
 "Of Church and circus": biography a commercial link is here – 
 
 Free scores by Gabriel Pierné on loumy.org

1863 births
1937 deaths
19th-century classical composers
19th-century conductors (music)
19th-century French composers
20th-century classical composers
20th-century French composers
20th-century French conductors (music)
20th-century French male musicians
Burials at Père Lachaise Cemetery
Chevaliers of the Légion d'honneur
Composers for piano
Composers for pipe organ
Concert band composers
French ballet composers
French classical organists
French male classical composers
French male conductors (music)
French male organists
French opera composers
French Romantic composers
Impressionist composers
Male opera composers
Musicians from Metz
Prix de Rome for composition
Male classical organists